Bacchisa kusamai is a species of beetle in the family Cerambycidae. It was described by Saito in 1999. It is known from Vietnam.

References

K
Beetles described in 1999